Lukićevo is a village in Serbia. It is located in the Zrenjanin municipality, in the Central Banat District, Vojvodina province. The village has a Serb ethnic majority (93.45%) and its population numbering 2,077 people (2002 census).

Name
Formerly, the village was known in Serbian as Martinica (Мартиница). Village is also known by names in other languages:  or Sigmundsdorf, .

Historical population

1961: 1,930
1971: 2,091
1981: 2,186
1991: 2,196
2002: 2,077
2011: 1,804

Notes

References
Slobodan Ćurčić, Broj stanovnika Vojvodine, Novi Sad, 1996.

See also
List of places in Serbia
List of cities, towns and villages in Vojvodina

Populated places in Serbian Banat
Zrenjanin